Cartago is a city in southwestern Colombia, about  west of Bogotá. It is in the extreme northern portion of the Valle del Cauca Department. It is located very close to the city of Pereira, about a 20-minute drive. It is the sixth largest city in Valle after Cali, Palmira, Buenaventura, Tuluá and Jamundí.

Overview 

Cartago features warm weather, about 30 degrees Celsius (≈86 degrees Fahrenheit) or more on a typical day with 80% dryness. The city is home to multiple farmhouses and farm owners, recreational sites, discos and condos frequented by people coming from Pereira.

Education 

The University of Valle has a branch campus in Cartago. The main Universidad del Valle campus is based in Cali, the department capital. The Cartago branch campus address is located at Calle 10 N° 19–05. Private institutions include the Instituto Técnico Colombiano, INTEC Cartago and Sena Institute.

Culture 

Artesanías (handcrafted products) are sold in several roadside shop in the city.

An 1856 watercolor of a mestizo couple in a roadside shop by Manuel María Paz is an early depiction of Cartago. Afro Colombians also resided in the town at that time.

Festivals include:
 Pedro Morales Pino Festival of Andean Colombian Music (February 4-March 4)—commenced in 2013 on the occasion of Morales Pino's sesquicentennial, a prominent local Bandola virtuoso, and organized by the local conservatory that bears his name.
 Feria de diseño independiente LAS PULGAS, organized by 3 VECES. (March and December)
 Encuentro Nacional de las Familias que Cantan, organized by EL CONSERVATORIO PEDRO MORALES PINO (July)

Transportation

 Santa Ana Airport
 Matecaña International Airport, serves the nearby city of Pereira
Cartago has an extensive network for taxis in the city, as well as minibuses (called busetas).

Notable people
Billy Pontoni - singer
Franco Family - doctors and architects

References

External links
Alcaldia de Cartago
Universidad del Valle - Cartago

Municipalities of Valle del Cauca Department
Populated places established in 1540